HD 19275 is a single star in the northern constellation of Cassiopeia. It has a white hue and is faintly visible to the naked eye with an apparent visual magnitude of 4.85. The distance to HD 19275 is 163 light years as determined using parallax measurements. It is drifting further away from the Sun with a radial velocity of around 12 km/s.

This object is an A-type main-sequence star with a stellar classification of A2Vnn. The 'nn' suffix indicates "nebulous" (broad) absorption lines in the spectrum due to rapid rotation. It is spinning with a projected rotational velocity of 250 km/s, which is giving the star an equatorial bulge that is estimated to be 15% larger than the polar radius. The object is an estimated 71 million years old with 1.8 times the mass of the Sun and about 2.7 times the Sun's radius. It is radiating 27 times the luminosity of the Sun from its photosphere at an effective temperature of 8,875 K.

References

A-type main-sequence stars
Cassiopeia (constellation)
Durchmusterung objects
019275
014862
0932